The Embassy of the State of Qatar, Nigeria is a diplomatic mission of the state of Qatar in Nigeria. It is the only representation of the state of Qatar in Nigeria. The embassy serves the Cameroon, Gabon and Sao Tome and was opened in the Federal Republic of Nigeria on 13 December 2013. The Mission is currently headed by Ambassador Dr. Ali bin Ghanim Alhajri.

Mission leaders

Ambassador 
 Ali Bin Ghanim Alhajri

Other Embassy members 
 Ahmad Mohammad Al-Horr (Counselor)
 Ahmad Ibrahim Mohammad Al-misnad (Second Secretary)

Previous embassy location 
 No. 1, Aguyi Ironsi, (Transcorp Hilton), Maitama FCT Abuja.

See also 
 Ministry of Foreign Affairs, Qatar

References 

Foreign relations of Qatar